James T. Campbell is an American historian. He is a professor of history at Stanford University. Campbell graduated from Yale University, in 1980, and from Stanford University, with a Ph.D. in 1989. He teaches at Stanford University, and formerly taught at Northwestern University and Brown University  Campbell collaborated with Susan Smulyan of Brown, and Ernie Limbo of Tougaloo College in creating the "Freedom Now!" website.

Awards
 2020 Guggenheim Fellowship
2007 Mark Lynton History Prize for Middle Passages: African American Journeys to Africa, 1787-2005
 2003-2004 Center for the Comparative Study of Race and Ethnicity Fellow, Stanford University
 2000-2001 Charles Warren Center for American History Fellow, Harvard University
 1996 Frederick Jackson Turner Award, Organization of American Historians, for Songs of Zion: The A.M.E. Church in the United States and South Africa
 1996 Carl Sandburg Literary Award for Non-Fiction for Songs of Zion
 1992-1993 Fulbright African Regional Research Fellowship,
 1992 National Endowment for the Humanities summer stipend

Works
 

  (paperback edition)

References

External links
"Freedom Now!", Tougaloo College and Brown University''

21st-century American historians
21st-century American male writers
Yale University alumni
Stanford University alumni
Northwestern University faculty
Brown University faculty
Stanford University Department of History faculty
Living people
Year of birth missing (living people)
American male non-fiction writers